Pandora is an 1819 neoclassical marble sculpture by Jean-Pierre Cortot, produced during his stay in Villa Medici in 1819. It shows the moment when Pandora received her box from Jupiter. It was exhibited at the 1819 Paris Salon.  It measures 159 × 48 × 35 cm.

François-Louis Dejuinne was inspired to make a drawing of it. This is in the collection of the Musée des Beaux-Arts d'Angers.

The work was purchased by the French Minister of the Interior, for the collection of the Musée des Beaux-Arts de Lyon, where it has been since 1820.

Gallery

References

1819 sculptures
Marble sculptures
Sculptures of the Museum of Fine Arts of Lyon
Sculptures of classical mythology